Christos Petrodimopoulos (Greek: Χρήστος Πετροδημόπουλος; born December 25, 1980) is a Greek professional basketball player. He is a 2.08 m (6 ft 10 in) tall power forward / center.

Professional career
In his pro career, some of the clubs Petrodimopoulos has played with in the top-tier level Greek Basket League include Panionios, Ikaros Kallitheas, and Nea Kifissia. He also played with Faros Keratsiniou, and with Faros, he qualified to the finals of the 2016 Greek Cup.

National team career
Petrodimopoulos was a member of the junior national teams of Greece. With Greece's junior national team, he played at the 2000 FIBA Europe Under-20 Championship.

References

External links
FIBA Archive Profile
Eurobasket.com Profile
Greek Basket League Profile 
Draftexpress.com Profile

1980 births
Living people
Aigaleo B.C. players
Centers (basketball)
Dafnis B.C. players
Diagoras Dryopideon B.C. players
Faros Keratsiniou B.C. players
Greek men's basketball players
Gymnastikos S. Larissas B.C. players
ICBS B.C. players
Ikaros B.C. players
Ionikos Nikaias B.C. players
Irakleio B.C. players
Kolossos Rodou B.C. players
Nea Kifissia B.C. players
Panionios B.C. players
Power forwards (basketball)
Sportspeople from Xanthi